The Budget Select Committee (Malay: Jawatankuasa Pilihan Khas Bajet; ; Tamil: மலேசியாவின் பட்ஜெட் சிறப்பு தேர்வுக் குழு) is one of many select committees of the Malaysian House of Representatives, which scrutinises the Malaysian federal budget. It is among six new bipartisan parliamentary select committees announced by Speaker of the House of Representatives, Mohamad Ariff Md Yusof, on 4 December 2018 in an effort to improve the institutional system.

Membership

14th Parliament 
As of December 2019, the Committee's current members are as follows:

Former members of the committee are as follows:

Chair of the Budget Select Committee

See also 
 Parliamentary Committees of Malaysia

References 

Parliament of Malaysia
Committees of the Parliament of Malaysia
Committees of the Dewan Rakyat